Sanat Ard Golestan Football Club is an Iranian football club based in Gorgan, Iran. They currently compete in the 2010–11 Golestan Provincial League.

Season-by-Season

The table below shows the achievements of the club in various competitions.

See also
 31 different Provincial Leagues

Football clubs in Iran
Association football clubs established in 2007
2007 establishments in Iran
Golestan Province